Eugénie Angot (née Legrand; born 27 June 1970) is a French equestrian. She competed in individual jumping and team jumping at the 2004 Summer Olympics in Athens.

Her father was composer Michel Legrand (1932-2019). She was previously married to fellow equestrian Patrice Delaveau. They had a daughter, Camille Delaveau (born ). They were later divorced. She married Cédric Angot, another fellow equestrian, in 1999. They had one son, Stanislas Angot.

References

External links

1970 births
Living people
French female equestrians
Olympic equestrians of France
Equestrians at the 2004 Summer Olympics